Simeon Končarević (about 1690 – 26 August 1769) was a Serbian Orthodox bishop in Venetian Dalmatia, serving from 1751 to 1757, before emigrating from Dalmatia to Imperial Russia with Jovan Horvat, the leader of the migrating Serbs. Končarević is the author of the "Chronicle of the Dalmatian (Orthodox) Bishop Simeon Končarević" which is unfortunately lost but which is preserved in the works by Nikodim Milaš.  Končarević, Dionisije Novaković, and Vasilije Jovanović-Brkić were important early Serbian 18th-century literary figures.

Biography
Simeon was educated in Zadar, Venice, and Kyiv Mohyla Academy (now National University of Kyiv-Mohyla Academy) where he became fluent in Latin, Italian, and Russian. He was appointed the parish priest of Benkovac in 1720 by Stevan Ljubibratić, the Serbian Orthodox bishop of Dalmatia (1716–20) who was expelled the same year by the Venetian government on the grounds that he had been invested by a foreign cleric. In Venetian Dalmatia, the Serbian clergy were forced to recognize the local Catholic bishop as their superiors. Serbs had to allow the local Catholic diocesan bishop to visit and inspect, randomly, any Orthodox church and forced the erection of a Roman Catholic altar beside the already existing Orthodox altar (and iconostasis) so that the Catholic services could be conducted at will. Končarević stopped Andrea Balbi, an Italian Catholic bishop, from making such a canonical visitation to the Serbian church in Benkovac by standing at the entrance and brandishing a saber, in 1728. Due to this, Končarević was imprisoned in a dungeon. After his release, he convoked an assembly of priests on 16 June 1731, the 22 participants deciding that the Serbian Orthodox priesthood did not recognize "no Latin bishops". The Orthodox clergy petitioned the state and wrote also to the Serbian Patriarch asking to appoint a bishop for Dalmatia. It took two more decades before a bishop was invested. In the meantime, the Dalmatian Serbs put up a valiant fight to preserve their national identity. Eventually, Končarević decided to become a monk in the Krupa monastery on Christmas day in 1751. He was consecrated by Bishop Gavrilo Mihić Mihailović (1741–1752) of the Metropolitanate of Dabar–Bosnia and two other bishops, with the permission of Patriarch Atanasije II Gavrilović of Peć.

Exile
Končarević was expelled from Dalmatia two years later (1753). The dissatisfied Serb population began to migrate to the neighboring territory of the Habsburg Empire. Such political unrest and the danger from the Uniates movement caused the departure of hundreds of people from North Dalmatia, under the leadership of Bishop Končarević, to Russia as well. A long time passed until the Serbs in Dalmatia were allowed to have their own bishop. Only under Napoleonic French domination were the Orthodox Serbs allowed to organize their church life and to have their own bishop. Following that dispensation, Metropolitan Benedikt Kraljević (1810–1829), a refugee from Bosnia as well, was appointed Bishop of Dalmatia. Upon the departure of the French, Bishop Benedikt, under heavy pressure from the Austrian authorities and the Roman Catholic Church, gave in to the Union. The Orthodox Serbs refused to accept the Uniate Church, and Bishop Benedikt was forced to abandon the Episcopal Throne.

See also
 Visarion Pavlović
 Zaharije Orfelin
 Jovan Rajić
 Mojsije Putnik
 Savatije Ljubibratić
 Stevan Ljubibratić

References

1690 births
1769 deaths
18th-century Serbian people
Serbian Orthodox clergy
Serbs of Croatia
Venetian Dalmatia
18th-century Eastern Orthodox bishops
People from the Russian Empire of Serbian descent
Emigrants from the Republic of Venice to the Russian Empire